The 2021-22 Ethiopian Premier League is the 75th season of top-tier football in Ethiopia (23rd season as the Premier League). The season started on October 17, 2021. The first round of matches were held at Hawassa stadium and Dire Dawa Stadium, while the second round of matches were held at Adama and Bahir dar Stadium.

League table
 2021-22 season 
The following 16 clubs competing in the Ethiopian Premier League during the 2021–22 season.

Top scorers

References 

Premier League
Premier League
Ethiopian Premier League
Ethiopian Premier League